Lukia Isanga Nakadama, sometimes written Rukia Isanga Nakadama, is a Ugandan businesswoman, educator and politician. She is the current Third Deputy Prime Minister of Uganda and Minister Without Portfolio, effective 9 June 2021.

Before that, she served as State Minister for Gender and Culture in the Ugandan Cabinet. She was appointed to that position in 2006. In the cabinet reshuffle of 16 February 2009, and that of 27 May 2011, she retained this cabinet post. She is also the elected Member of Parliament (MP) for Mayuge District Women's Representative. She has been continuously re-elected to that position since 2001.

Background and education
Isanga Nakadama was born on 2 February 1970. She was raised in a polygamous family, the 6th born of her mother's 12 children. Her father had two other wives. She attended Nabisunsa Girls School, a public middle and high school, located in Nakawa Division in northeastern Kampala, the capital city of Uganda. She obtained a Certificate in Teaching, prior to 1999, from the Institute of Teacher Education Kyambogo (ITEK), which is now part of Kyambogo University, one of Uganda's eight public universities, as of February 2015. She also holds a diploma in Customs Clearing & Forwarding, which she obtained in 2000. Her diploma in Education was obtained in 2004, from the Islamic University in Uganda (IUIU). She also holds a degree of Bachelor of Arts in Public Administration from IUIU.

Career
Prior to 2001, she worked as a private businesswoman and as a teacher at the Hassantourabi Education Centre in Mayuge District. She was first elected to Parliament in 2001, as the Woman Representative for her home district of Mayuge. In 2006, she was re-elected to continue representing the same constituency. She was appointed to her present cabinet post in 2006.

Personal details
Rukia Nakadama is of the Islamic faith. She is married to Hajji Daudi Isanga. She belongs to the National Resistance Movement political party.

See also
 Cabinet of Uganda
 Parliament of Uganda
 Mayuge District

References

External links
  Website of the Parliament of Uganda

1970 births
Living people
Ugandan Muslims
Islamic University in Uganda alumni
Kyambogo University alumni
Ugandan educators
People from Mayuge District
Members of the Parliament of Uganda
Government ministers of Uganda
National Resistance Movement politicians
People from Eastern Region, Uganda
21st-century Ugandan women politicians
21st-century Ugandan politicians
Women government ministers of Uganda
Women members of the Parliament of Uganda